A constellation is formally any of certain areas of the celestial sphere, or popularly and traditionally a perceived pattern of stars.

Constellation or constellations may also refer to:

Aerospace 
 Constellation Airlines, a defunct Belgian charter airline
 Lockheed Constellation, a propeller-driven airliner
 Constellation program, a canceled NASA human space exploration program
 Satellite constellation, a group of satellites

Arts, entertainment, and media

Music 
 Constellation Records (disambiguation), the name of three different record labels
 The Constellations, an American hip hop/rock band
 "Constellation" (composition), a 1948 contrafact of "I Got Rhythm" by Charlie Parker
 "Constellations" (song), the 2009 debut single by indie rock band Darwin Deez
 "Constellations", a song by Duster from the album Stratosphere

Albums 
 Constellation (Sonny Stitt album), 1972
 Constellations (Dave Douglas album), 1995
 Constellation (Alabama Thunderpussy album), 2000
 Constellations (August Burns Red album), 2009
 Constellations, a 2010 album by Balmorhea
 Constellations (Esprit D'Air album), 2017
 Constellation (Jim Cuddy album), 2018

EPs 
  Constellation (EP), an Extended Play by black metal band Arcturus, 1994

Science fiction
 Constellations: Stories of the Future, a 1980 science fiction anthology
 Constellations (2005 book), a 2005 science fiction anthology
 Con†Stellation, an annual general-interest science fiction convention held in Huntsville, Alabama
 ConStellation, the 41st World Science Fiction Convention, held in Baltimore in 1983

Other uses in arts, entertainment, and media 

 Constellation (Fabergé egg), one of two Easter eggs made under the supervision of Peter Carl Fabergé in 1917
 Constellation (film), a 2007 film set in Huntsville, Alabama
 Constellation Theatre Company (Washington, D.C.)
 Constellations (Miró), a 1939 artwork series by Joan Miró
 Constellations (play), a 2012 play premiered at the Royal Court Theatre
 Sozvezdie (film festival), a Russian film festival that translates to "Constellation"

Business and industry 
 Constellation Brands, a major wine, beer and spirits company
 Constellation (energy company), a power generation company
 EURion constellation, an anti-counterfeiting scheme
 Sozvezdie, a Russian electronic warfare company, meaning "Constellation"

Science and technology 
 Prime constellation, a pattern of prime numbers
 Constellation diagram, a means of representing a modulation scheme in digital communications
 Sun Constellation System, a petascale computing environment from Sun Microsystems

Transport
 GTS Celebrity Constellation, a Celebrity Cruises ship
 USS Constellation, a series of U.S. Navy ships
 C/S Salamis Glory, a cruise ship, formerly named Constellation
 Volkswagen Constellation
Constellation (yacht), 12-metre class yacht

Other 
 Constellations (journal), a peer-reviewed sociology journal
 Family Constellations